The Sikorsky S-38 was an American twin-engined ten-seat sesquiplane amphibious aircraft. It was Sikorsky's first widely produced amphibious flying boat, serving successfully for Pan American Airways and the United States military.

Design and development
The S-38 was developed based upon experience with the Sikorsky S-34 and S-36. The S-38 first flew in May 1928. According to Sikorsky, "The ship had very good takeoff characteristics from land and water. All these features were excellent for 1928 and at that time there were no other amphibians with such performance characteristics. In 1929, an S-38 was used by Colonel Lindbergh to inaugurate air mail service between the United States and the Panama Canal." The United States Navy ordered two aircraft, and Pan Am was an early customer.

A total of 101 aircraft were built, manufactured originally by the Sikorsky Manufacturing Corporation of Long Island, New York, and by the Sikorsky Aviation Corporation in Bridgeport, Connecticut. Sikorsky was acquired by United Aircraft and Transport Corporation in mid-production.

Variants

S-38A
11 Built
S-38B 
Ten-place model, 80 Built
S-38C 
12-place model, ten Built
C-6
United States Army Air Forces designation for the S-38A for evaluation, one aircraft later used as a VIP transport.
C-6A
United States Army Air Forces designation for a C-6 with minor changes, ten aircraft.
XPS-2
United States Navy designation for the S-38A, two aircraft later converted to XRS-2 transports.
PS-3
United States Navy designation for the S-38B, four aircraft later converted to RS-3 transports.
XRS-2
United States Navy designation for two XPS-2 converted as transports.
RS-3
United States Navy/Marine Corps designation for the S-38B transport version, three aircraft and conversions from PS-3.

Operators

Civil operators
 KNILM
 Curtiss Flying Service
 Hawaiian Airlines
 Inter-Island Airways
 New York, Rio, and Buenos Aires Line (NYRBA) - Used for first airmail from Argentina to Miami. All sold to Pan Am in 1930
 Pan American-Grace Airways – Operated out of Lima, Peru
 Western Air Express

Military operators
Spanish Republican Air Force. One unit was used on the Northern Front during the Spanish Civil War. Shot down by friendly fire
 United States Army Air Forces
 United States Marine Corps
 United States Navy

Private operators

Some notable private owners include:
 Flying Hutchinsons – first attempted around-the-world flight by a family
 Howard Hughes
 Herbert Fisk Johnson Jr. – Explored the northeastern part of Brazil in search of the carnauba palm, and to research carnauba wax, the source of the world's hardest natural wax. The Spirit of Carnauba, a replica of this aircraft, is on display in Fortaleza Hall on the S. C. Johnson campus.
 Martin and Osa Johnson – In the zebra-striped S-38 Osa's Ark, with companion giraffe-patterned S-39 Spirit of Africa, explored Africa extensively, making safari movies and books. 
 Charles Lindbergh – surveyed South American and Pacific Ocean routes for Pan Am with Anne Morrow Lindbergh.
 Robert R. McCormick, newspaper publisher – surveyed commercial air routes between North America and Europe.

Reproductions
During the 1990s two reproduction S-38s were built by the late Buzz Kaplan's “Born Again Restorations,” of Owatonna, Minnesota.  One was produced for Samuel Curtis Johnson Jr., the son of Herbert Fisk Johnson, to recreate his father's flight, which he completed in 1998.   the plane is suspended from the ceiling of Fortaleza Hall in the S. C. Johnson & Son company headquarters in Racine, Wisconsin .  The other S-38 replica, N28V, appeared in the movie The Aviator (2004), a story loosely based on the life of Howard Hughes, who owned an S-38 during his lifetime.  it is owned by Kermit Weeks and located at the Fantasy of Flight Museum in Polk City, Florida, bearing the Osa's Ark paint scheme.

Accidents and incidents
 A SCADTA (actually Avianca, never was a Pan Am subsidiary) S-38, NC9107, crashed in the Colombian jungle near Pereira, killing all but one on board; the survivor was carried for seven days through the jungle to civilization.
 T. Raymond Finucane, a wealthy Rochester, NY businessman, and three others disappeared over the sea aboard a Sikorsky Amphibian after departing Norfolk, Virginia for New York City March 22, 1929. In Miami, Florida, Finucane had wagered a friend who was traveling ahead by train that he (Finucane) would reach New York first. He chartered Curtiss Flying Service to fly him to New York from Miami. Also on board the missing aircraft were Frank Ables and J. Boyd, Curtiss mechanics, along with Harry Smith, the pilot. A massive search by Curtiss planes, American military planes, coast guard cutters, and even the airship Los Angeles failed to turn up anything. Mrs. Finucane, founding president of the Rochester Community Players, visited the Curtiss operation at Roosevelt Field, the destination of the flight, for updates. Wreckage presumed to be from this plane was found eight years later by a fishing schooner.
 On September 25, 1932, a Panair do Brasil Sikorsky S-38 registration P-BDAD still bearing the titles of Nyrba do Brasil was seized in the company's hangar by three men, who took a fourth man hostage. None were aviators but they managed to take off. However the aircraft crashed in São João de Meriti, killing the four men. Apparently the hijack was related to the events of the Constitutionalist Revolution in São Paulo and it is considered to be the first hijack that took place in Brazil.

Specifications (S-38-B)

See also

References

Further reading

External links

1933 film of a flight of an S-38 into the mountains of BC

S-038
1920s United States airliners
Flying boats
Amphibious aircraft
Twin-boom aircraft
Sesquiplanes
Pan Am
Aircraft first flown in 1928
Twin piston-engined tractor aircraft